Ectonucleotide pyrophosphatase/phosphodiesterase family member 3 is an enzyme that in humans is encoded by the ENPP3 gene.

Function 

The protein encoded by this gene belongs to a series of ectoenzymes that are involved in hydrolysis of extracellular nucleotides. These ectoenzymes possess ATPase and ATP pyrophosphatase activities and are type II transmembrane proteins. Expression of the related rat mRNA has been found in a subset of immature glial cells and in the alimentary tract. The corresponding rat protein has been detected in the pancreas, small intestine, colon, and liver. The human mRNA is expressed in glioma cells, prostate, and uterus. Expression of the human protein has been detected in uterus, basophils, and mast cells.

This protein has also been used in conjunction with CD63 as a marker for activated basophils in the Basophil Activation Test for IgE mediated allergic reactions.

References

Further reading